Wodyetia bifurcata, the foxtail palm,  is a species of palm in the family Arecaceae, native to Queensland, Australia. It is the sole species in the genus Wodyetia.

The Palm and Cycads Societies of Australia (PACSOA) describes this palm as follows:

"Very attractive palm with long (2-3m.) plumose leaves (hence the name 'Foxtail'), and up to 10m tall with a grey trunk. It produces large (about the size of a duck egg) orange fruit"

Etymology 
Most of the world was unaware of the existence of this 'spectacular' palm until 1978, when an Aboriginal man brought it to botanists and the world's attention

The Aboriginal name of that Aboriginal man has been recorded as being "Wodyeti", thus the genus name for this Australian endemic species Wodyetia. The specific name "bifurcata" is from Latin meaning “divided into two parts”, in reference to the forking ("bifurcate") fibres covering the seeds.

Description 

Flowering: White flowers stalk that comes from the base of the crownshaft.

Foliage: Variance of greenish colors; deep green to light green colors. Received its more commonly known Australian-English name from the appearance of its foliage, which is in a shape of a fox’s tail.

Fruits: 2 inches long.  Olive green to green in the early stages. Orange red when ripe.

Trunk: Similar to the king palm, the foxtail palm trunk is smooth, thin, and self-cleaning. It grows a single, double, or triple trunk that is slightly spindle-shaped to columnar reaching heights of about 10 m (30 ft). The trunk also has a closely ringed, dark grey to light gray color which slowly turns more and more white. The crownshaft of the foxtail palm is light to bright green and slightly swollen at the base.

Distribution 
This species is endemic to the Cape Melville range, within the Cape Melville National Park in Queensland Australia.  It was described in 1978, and was classed as a rare palm, both within Queensland, and on the IUCN's Red List of Threatened Species.

After it became known to the world, the Foxtail Palm's seeds were so highly sought after that a thriving black market trade formed, with illegal collectors nearly decimating the in situ populations. The species propagates readily in cultivation and this ultimately reduced the pressure on the wild population. It has become widely distributed across the world, being progressively planted out as one of the "world's most popular" palms.

Ecology and habitat 
The foxtail palm is endemic to a very small part of Australia, originally decorating the boulder-strewn, exposed gravel hills of the Cape Melville range, wholly within the Cape Melville National Park.

The area has been recognised for its rich biocultural diversity, having long and intense Aboriginal associations and a rich biodiversity.

See also 
 Queensland's 1993 Cape Melville affair involved the alleged theft of foxtail palms from a national park

References

External links 
 Palm and Cycad Societies of Australia webpage on Wodyetia bifurcataAccessed 3 May 2008
 Palmguide.org picture of Wodyetia bifurcata

Ptychospermatinae
Palms of Australia
Conservation dependent flora of Australia
Conservation dependent biota of Queensland
Nature Conservation Act vulnerable biota
Vulnerable flora of Australia
Flora of Queensland
Monotypic Arecaceae genera
Taxonomy articles created by Polbot